The Williams W-17 Stinger is an American homebuilt racing aircraft that was designed for Formula One Air Racing by Art Williams and produced by his company, Williams Aircraft Design of Northridge, California, introduced in 1971. The aircraft was at one time available in the form of plans for amateur construction, but only one was ever constructed.

Design and development
The W-17 Stinger features a cantilever mid-wing, a single-seat enclosed cockpit under a bubble canopy, fixed conventional landing gear and a single engine in tractor configuration.

The aircraft fuselage is made from sheet aluminum in a monocoque structure. The wings are all-wood, with laminated spruce spars. Its  span wing employs a NACA 64008 airfoil at the wing root, transitioning to a NACA 64010 at the wing tip. As the Formula One rules require, the engine is a  Continental O-200A powerplant.

Operational history
Only one example of the W-17 Stinger was registered in the United States with the Federal Aviation Administration in 1971.

The sole example was raced at the Reno Air Races by pilot John P. Jones in 1973 and captured second place.

Aircraft on display
Planes of Fame Air Museum - sole example built

Specifications (W-17 Stinger)

References

External links
Photo of the Williams W-17 Stinger

W-17 Stinger
1970s United States sport aircraft
Single-engined tractor aircraft
Mid-wing aircraft
Homebuilt aircraft
Racing aircraft
Aircraft first flown in 1971